Qaher Hazrat (born in 1981/1982 in Pul-e-Charkhi), is an Afghan cyclist. The International Paralympic Committee describes him as "one of the country's top speed cyclists – in both disabled and able-bodied competition".

At the age of 14, in 1996, he lost both legs below the knees when he stepped on a landmine.

He was the first man ever to officially represent Afghanistan at the Paralympic Games when he competed in road race cycling (time trial, LC3 disability category) at the 2004 Summer Paralympics in Athens. With 26 points, he finished last out of fourteen cyclists in his event.

See also
 Mareena Karim
 Afghanistan at the Paralympics

References 

Afghan male cyclists
Cyclists at the 2004 Summer Paralympics
Paralympic cyclists of Afghanistan
1980s births
Living people
People from Kabul Province